Cyphocharax is a genus of fish in the family Curimatidae native to South America.

Species
There are currently 41 recognized species in this genus:
 Cyphocharax abramoides (Kner, 1858)
 Cyphocharax aninha Wosiacki & D. P. S. Miranda, 2014 
 Cyphocharax aspilos Vari, 1992
 Cyphocharax biocellatus Vari, Sidlauskas & Le Bail, 2012 
 Cyphocharax derhami Vari & F. Chang, 2006
 Cyphocharax festivus Vari, 1992
 Cyphocharax gangamon Vari, 1992
 Cyphocharax gilbert (Quoy & Gaimard, 1824)
 Cyphocharax gillii (C. H. Eigenmann & C. H. Kennedy, 1903)
 Cyphocharax gouldingi Vari, 1992
 Cyphocharax helleri (Steindachner, 1910)
 Cyphocharax jagunco Dutra, Penido, G. C. G. Mello & Pessali, 2016 
 Cyphocharax laticlavius Vari & Blackledge, 1996
 Cyphocharax leucostictus (C. H. Eigenmann & R. S. Eigenmann, 1889)
 Cyphocharax lundi Dutra, Penido, G. C. G. Mello & Pessali, 2016 
 Cyphocharax magdalenae (Steindachner, 1878)
 Cyphocharax meniscaprorus Vari, 1992
 Cyphocharax mestomyllon Vari, 1992
 Cyphocharax microcephalus (C. H. Eigenmann & R. S. Eigenmann, 1889)
 Cyphocharax modestus (Fernández-Yépez, 1948)
 Cyphocharax multilineatus (G. S. Myers, 1927)
 Cyphocharax nagelii (Steindachner, 1881)
 Cyphocharax nigripinnis Vari, 1992
 Cyphocharax notatus (Steindachner, 1908)
 Cyphocharax oenas Vari, 1992
 Cyphocharax pantostictos Vari & Barriga-S., 1990
 Cyphocharax pinnilepis Vari, Zanata & Camelier, 2010
 Cyphocharax platanus (Günther, 1880)
 Cyphocharax plumbeus (C. H. Eigenmann & R. S. Eigenmann, 1889)
 Cyphocharax punctatus (Vari & Nijssen, 1986)
 Cyphocharax saladensis (Meinken, 1933) 
 Cyphocharax sanctigabrielis B. F. Melo & Vari, 2014 
 Cyphocharax santacatarinae (Fernández-Yépez, 1948)
 Cyphocharax signatus Vari, 1992
 Cyphocharax spilotus (Vari, 1987)
 Cyphocharax spiluropsis (C. H. Eigenmann & R. S. Eigenmann, 1889)
 Cyphocharax spilurus (Günther, 1864)
 Cyphocharax stilbolepis Vari, 1992
 Cyphocharax vanderi (Britski, 1980)
 Cyphocharax vexillapinnus Vari, 1992
 Cyphocharax voga (R. F. Hensel, 1870)

References

Curimatidae
Taxa named by Henry Weed Fowler
Fish of South America